q-Gaussian processes are deformations of the usual Gaussian distribution. There are several different versions of this; here we treat a multivariate deformation, also addressed as q-Gaussian process, arising from free probability theory and corresponding to deformations of the canonical commutation relations. For other deformations of Gaussian distributions, see q-Gaussian distribution and Gaussian q-distribution.

History 

The q-Gaussian process was formally introduced in a paper by Frisch and Bourret under the name of parastochastics, and also later by Greenberg as an example of infinite statistics. It was mathematically established and investigated in
papers by Bozejko and Speicher and by Bozejko, Kümmerer, and Speicher in the context of non-commutative probability.

It is given as the distribution of sums of creation and annihilation operators in a q-deformed Fock space. The calculation of moments of those operators is given by a q-deformed version of a Wick formula or Isserlis formula. The specification of a special covariance in the underlying Hilbert space leads to the q-Brownian motion, a special non-commutative version of classical Brownian motion.

q-Fock space 

In the following  is fixed.
Consider a Hilbert space . On the algebraic full Fock space
 
where  with a norm one vector , called vacuum, we define a q-deformed inner product as follows:

The q-Fock space is then defined as the completion of the algebraic full Fock space with respect to this inner product

For  the q-inner product is strictly positive. For  and  it is positive, but has a kernel, which leads in these cases to the symmetric and anti-symmetric Fock spaces, respectively.

For  we define the q-creation operator , given by

Its adjoint (with respect to the q-inner product), the q-annihilation operator , is given by

q-commutation relations 

Those operators satisfy the q-commutation relations

With the exception of the case  the operators  are bounded.

q-Gaussian elements and definition of multivariate q-Gaussian distribution (q-Gaussian process) 

Operators of the form 

On  we consider the vacuum expectation state

The (multivariate) q-Gaussian distribution or q-Gaussian process is defined as the non commutative distribution of a collection of q-Gaussians with respect to the vacuum expectation state.

where  denotes the number of crossings of the pair-partition . This is a q-deformed version of the Wick/Isserlis formula.

q-Gaussian distribution in the one-dimensional case 

For p = 1, the q-Gaussian distribution is a probability measure on the interval , with analytic formulas for its density. The determination of the density follows from old results on corresponding orthogonal polynomials.

Operator algebraic questions 

Understanding the structure of those von Neumann algebras for general q has been a source of many investigations. It is now known, by work of Guionnet and Shlyakhtenko, that at least for finite I and for small values of q, the von Neumann algebra is isomorphic to the corresponding free group factor.

References 

Probability distributions